Lauren Steadman  (born 18 December 1992) is a British Paralympic athlete who has competed in four Summer Paralympics, in both swimming and the paratriathlon. She competed at both the 2008 Summer Paralympics in Beijing and the 2012 Summer Paralympics in London as a swimmer, before switching to the paratriathlon for the 2016 Games in Rio where she won a silver medal in the Women's PT4. She won the gold medal in the Women's PTS5 at the 2020 Games in Tokyo.

Life and career
Steadman was born in Peterborough in 1992. She has won medals in 2009 and in 2011 at the IPC European Championships. Her uncle was a triathlete and he suggested she try it. Steadman was educated at Great Gidding Primary School, then privately at the independent Mount Kelly school in Tavistock, Devon, and completed a BSc (Hons) Psychology degree, followed by a master's degree in Business and Management at the University of Portsmouth.

On 20 August 2018 it was announced that Steadman would be a contestant on series 16 of the BBC's Strictly Come Dancing, partnered with AJ Pritchard. She made it to the Semi Final but was eliminated against Ashley Roberts and Pasha Kovalev in the dance-off. She went on to perform in the live version of the show.

Steadman completed and was one of two finalists in series 2 of Celebrity SAS: Who Dares Wins.

Paratriathlon career
In 2013 and 2014 Steadman won medals at the European Championships Paratriathlon. In 2014, she won the London World Series Paratriathlon, gained a degree in Psychology and became the World Champion Paratriathlete in Edmonton, Canada.

Paratriathlon became an Olympic sport at the 2016 Summer Paralympics in Rio de Janeiro. Steadman took the Silver medal behind Grace Norman of the US.

Competing in the Women's PTS5 classification at the 2020 Summer Paralympics in Tokyo, Steadman overtook Grace Norman early in the cycling leg and maintained her lead through the run to take the gold medal by 41 seconds.

Steadman was appointed Member of the Order of the British Empire (MBE) in the 2022 New Year Honours for services to triathlon.

See also
 Great Britain at the 2008 Summer Paralympics
 Great Britain at the 2012 Summer Paralympics
 Great Britain at the 2016 Summer Paralympics
 Great Britain at the 2020 Summer Paralympics

References

External links 

 
 
 
 
 

1992 births
Living people
British female swimmers
British female triathletes
Medalists at the 2016 Summer Paralympics
Medalists at the 2020 Summer Paralympics
Paralympic medalists in paratriathlon
Paralympic gold medalists for Great Britain
Paralympic silver medalists for Great Britain
Paralympic swimmers of Great Britain
Paratriathletes at the 2016 Summer Paralympics
Paratriathletes at the 2020 Summer Paralympics
Paratriathletes of Great Britain
People educated at Mount Kelly School
People from Huntingdon
S9-classified Paralympic swimmers
Sportspeople from Peterborough
Swimmers at the 2008 Summer Paralympics
Swimmers at the 2012 Summer Paralympics
Medalists at the World Para Swimming Championships
Medalists at the World Para Swimming European Championships
Alumni of the University of Portsmouth
Members of the Order of the British Empire
Television presenters with disabilities
British female freestyle swimmers
21st-century British women